The Bourse is a municipal building in Gothenburg, western Sweden. It is located on the north side of Gustaf Adolf Square.

Originally it was designed as a mercantile exchange, with a ballroom, by architect Pehr Johan Ekman in the Neoclassical style. It opened on 1 December 1849. The Gothenburg City Council has conducted its meetings here since 5 January 1863.

The Swedish term for this building, Börsen (derived from the French "La bourse"), is frequently mis-translated into English as "The Stock Exchange". However, the building was never primarily a stock exchange, but rather a commercial exchange or mercantile exchange (see Exchange (organized market)), in the same spirit as a modern commodities exchange. Although the Gothenburg exchange had no royal patronage, it fulfilled a similar function to the contemporaneous royal exchanges of, for example, Dublin, Edinburgh and London.

History
By statute enacted in 1661, the first trade guild in Sweden was created in Gothenburg, meeting at a town hall building located on what is now the Gustaf Adolf Square.

The current Bourse building is located on the site of the Kaulbarska House, that had been owned by Baron Johan von Kaulbars, who had been a general in the army of King Charles XII.  The mansion was demolished in the early 19th century, to make way for a new civic building.  

By 1844, the city's merchants had raised enough funds for the construction of this building, with the cornerstone being laid on 1 June 1844 and completion in 1849.

External links

Listed buildings in Gothenburg
City and town halls in Sweden
Government buildings completed in 1849
1849 establishments in Sweden
Commodity exchanges
Ballrooms
Neoclassical architecture in Sweden